John Martin (4 December 1946 – 16 November 2013) was an English footballer who played as a winger in the Football League.

Career
Born in Ashington, Martin made one appearance for Aston Villa before making appearances in the Football League for Colchester United, Workington, where he made over 200 league appearances, and Southport, and in non-league football for  Chelmsford City, Wigan Athletic and Formby.

Martin lived in Tenerife from 1997. In 2006, he was diagnosed with leukaemia. He died in November 2013.

References

1946 births
2013 deaths
Sportspeople from Ashington
Footballers from Northumberland
Association football wingers
English footballers
Aston Villa F.C. players
Colchester United F.C. players
Chelmsford City F.C. players
Workington A.F.C. players
Southport F.C. players
Wigan Athletic F.C. players
Formby F.C. players
English Football League players